Giorgos Katiforis (1934/1935 – 12 April 2022) was a Greek politician from the Panhellenic Socialist Movement who served as a Member of the European Parliament.

References

Date of birth missing
1930s births
2022 deaths
Greek politicians
20th-century Greek politicians
21st-century Greek politicians
MEPs for Greece 1999–2004
PASOK MEPs
Politicians from Athens